Tuxá (Tusha; also Todela ~ Rodela, Carapató, Payacú) was the eastern Brazilian language of the Tuxá people, who now speak Portuguese. The language ceased being spoken in the late 19th century, but in the 1960s a research team found two women that had been expelled from the Tuxa tribe in Bahia who knew some thirty words.

It was spoken along the São Francisco River near Glória, Bahia, and was reported by Loukotka (1968) to have more recently been in the village of Rodelas, Pernambuco (now part of Bahia).

Vocabulary

Loukotka (1968)
Loukotka (1968) lists the following basic vocabulary items.

{| class="wikitable"
! gloss !! Tushá
|-
| ear || kramakeː
|-
| tooth || takaí
|-
| man || zyunkurun
|-
| sun || enkeː
|-
| moon || zyerõmeːkeː
|-
| earth || zyerintin
|}

Pompeu (1958)
Tushá vocabulary collected by Antônio Likaro e Cordorina in Rodelas:

{| class="wikitable sortable"
! Portuguese gloss (original) !! English gloss (translated) !! Tushá
|-
| sol || sun || enkê
|-
| lua || moon || jerõmêkê
|-
| céu || sky || eisrêmêkê
|-
| terra || earth || jerintin
|-
| Rio São Francisco || São Francisco River || Kaleshí
|-
| homem || man || junkurun
|-
| mulher || woman || lãkãtí
|-
| menino || boy || jití
|-
| menina || girl || kaití
|-
| cabelo || hair || tixí
|-
| dente || tooth || takaí
|-
| orelha || ear || kramákê
|-
| cachimbo || smoking pipe || tôrú
|-
| teiú || Tupinambis lizard || tishiriú
|}

Meader (1978)
In 1961, Wilbur Pickering recorded the following word list in Juazeiro, Bahia from Maria Dias dos Santos. She was an elderly rememberer of Tuxá who was born in Rodelas, but later moved to Juazeiro.

{| class="wikitable sortable"
! Portuguese gloss (original) !! English gloss (translated) !! Tuxá
|-
| água || water || ˈmiˈaŋga
|-
| cabeça || head || kaˈka
|-
| cabelo || hair || kakaˈi
|-
| cachorro || dog || kašuˈi
|-
| carne || meat || oˈtiši
|-
| criança (menino) || child (boy) || guřituˈi
|-
| fogo || fire || toˈe
|-
| fumo || smoke || paˈka
|-
| muitas || many || kalatuˈi
|-
| muitas cabeças || many heads || kalatuˈi kaˈka
|-
| ovelha || sheep || alvεˈmą
|-
| panela || pan || ˈmunduřu
|-
| sol || sun || šaˈřola
|-
| pessoa suja || dirty person || ˈšuvaˈd̯ya
|-
| acangatara || acangatara (type of ceremonial feather headband) || ˈgoxo
|-
| cachaça || cachaça || auˈřiŋka
|-
| cachimbo || smoking pipe || maˈlaku
|-
| chocalho || rattle || mařaˈka
|-
| deus || God || tumˈpą
|-
| dinheiro || money || kaːmˈba
|-
| farinha || flour || koˈñuna
|-
| gado || cattle || gadiˈma
|-
| melancia || watermelon || ˈvεřdoˈa
|-
| negro || black || tupiˈʌŋka
|-
| peba || six-banded armadillo || kabulεˈtε
|-
| porco || pig || ˈmokoˈxε
|-
| preá || Brazilian guinea pig || šuˈřį
|-
| soldado || soldier || sokoˈdo
|-
| tatu || armadillo || putiˈa
|-
| trempe || twitch || mυsˈtřυ̨
|-
| urubu || vulture || uˈřikuˈři tutuˈa (?)
|-
| quem gosta de apreciar o Guarani || who likes to enjoy the Guarani || kalamaˈši; kalatuˈi; kaˈlamototuˈa
|}

References

  (Tuxá wordlist §3.8, p30)
 

Indigenous languages of Northeastern Brazil
Extinct languages of South America
Language isolates of South America
Languages extinct in the 19th century